St. Paul's Church is a church in Gibraltar. It is located in northwestern Gibraltar, along Varyl Begg Estate.

References

Roman Catholic churches in Gibraltar